Ibrahim Deif (born 29 October 1962) is an Egyptian academic and the former minister of education as part of the Qandil cabinet.

Early life and education
Deif was born on 29 October 1962. He received a bachelor of science degree in power mechanics from Assiut University in May 1984. He also obtained his master of science degree and PhD from the same university in 1990 and 1994, respectively. His field of speciality is curriculum design.

Career
Deif started his career as a teaching assistant at Assuit University in 1984. He worked at the same university at different posts until 2005. Then he began to work at Suez Canal University in 2005. He was elected as the dean of the faculty of education at Suez Canal University in 2008. Then he became the vice president of Suez Canal University for Suez Branch Affairs on 29 March 2012. His term will last until 28 March 2016.

Deif was appointed Egypt's minister of education on 2 August 2012. He has no political affiliation, and therefore, was one of the independent ministers in the Qandil cabinet. His term ended on 16 July 2013 and Mahmoud Abo El Nasr replaced him in the post.

Criticism
In October 2012, Deif reported his acceptance of the corporal punishment in schools "as long as the beating is not severe and no stick is used." Upon his declaration, the Coalition for Children's Rights in Egypt submitted a lawsuit to Egypt's general prosecutor against Deif.

References

21st-century Egyptian politicians
1962 births
Living people
Assiut University alumni
Academic staff of Assiut University
Academic staff of Suez Canal University
Qandil Cabinet
Education Ministers of Egypt